Phtheochroa ochrobasana is a species of moth of the family Tortricidae. It is found in Spain, Algeria and Saudi Arabia.

The wingspan is 15–17 mm. Adults have been recorded on wing from October to November.

References

Moths described in 1915
Phtheochroa